Exford is a town in Victoria, Australia,  west of Melbourne's Central Business District, located within the City of Melton local government area. Exford recorded a population of 133 at the 2021 census.

The town is located on the west and south bank of the Melton Reservoir, which was completed in 1916 to supply the Werribee Irrigation District, and also functions as a recreation site with barbecue and picnic facilities. Exford Post Office opened on 1 September 1911 and closed in 1964.

Exford is home to the Melbourne Runabout and Speedboat Club. A primary school with 200 students is also based in Exford.

References

External links

Towns in Victoria (Australia)
City of Melton